Li Ziqi (September 29, 1923 – January 11, 2014) was a People's Republic of China politician. He was born in Shenmu County, Shaanxi Province. He was Chinese Communist Party Committee Secretary of Gansu (March 1983 – November 1990).

Personal life
Li's son, Li Ningping (born 1951), is a retired politician and business executive who has been  investigated by China's top anti-graft agency in December 2020.

References

1923 births
2014 deaths
People's Republic of China politicians from Shaanxi
Chinese Communist Party politicians from Shaanxi
Political office-holders in Gansu